ZZ Leiden Basketball, also known as Zorg en Zekerheid Leiden, is a basketball club based in Leiden, Netherlands. The club plays in the BNXT League, the domestic first tier league. Their home games are played at Vijf Meihal, which has 2,000 seats.

ZZ Leiden has won the national championship four times, the NBB Cup four times, the Dutch Supercup three times and the BNXT championship once. Leiden was a European Club Winner's Cup semi-finalist in 1980.

History

The old Leiden team (1958–1986)

On September 23, 1958, the club was founded as Bona Stars by Ton Kallenberg, a physical education professor at a school in Leiden. In 1967 the club entered the eredivisie, the highest professional basketball league in the Netherlands under the name BS Leiden. 

When Parker became the main sponsor of the club in 1977 Leiden won its first national championship (1977/1978). During this era the team finished five times as runners-up in the league. In 1979/1980 Leiden reached the semi-finals of the European Club Winner's Cup (later: Saporta Cup, ULEB Cup or EuroCup), their best European result up till now. In 1986, Leiden was forced to leave the eredivisie, due to the absence of a main sponsor. The team played five years in the Promotiedivisie, the highest non-professional league, before pulling out of the Dutch basketball pyramid.

The Rise of ZZ (2006–2010)
On February 16, 2006, it was announced that Leiden would return at the highest stage in the Netherlands. The team got a new main sponsor in Zorg en Zekerheid and would play its games in the Vijf Meihal.

After being quarter- and semifinalist in a few seasons, Leiden returned to the top of the Netherlands in 2010. Leading players of the ZZ team were Danny Gibson, who was named the DBL Most Valuable Player Award in 2009–10, and Seamus Boxley. The club won its first NBB Cup, by beating ABC Amsterdam in the championship game. In the Semi-final, heavy favorites Groningen were defeated. In the Playoffs Semi-finals, ZZ once again faced Groningen. The team put up an impressive fight against the top seed, but eventually fell short 3–2.

Back at the top of Dutch basketball (2010–present)
In the 2010–11 season, ZZ Leiden came back on top of the Dutch basketball world as best club. In the regular season, the team finished first. The second DBL title was eventually won, after beating Groningen 4–3 in the Finals. The deciding game 7 turned out to be historic, including three overtimes, which ended in 96–95.

The following year the team its second NBB Cup, but was defeated in the Finals of the DBL. ZZ Leiden also reached the Round of 16 in the EuroChallenge 2011-12 after their second place in the first group stage this season. In 2013 the team got its third national championship, by going undefeated in the play-offs and beating Aris Leeuwarden in the Finals.

The 2013–14 was a struggling one for Leiden. The team ended on the 4th place in the regular season and lost in the Semifinals to Groningen. After the end of the season, Leiden decided to part ways with head coach Toon van Helfteren.  Van Helfteren eventually won six trophies with Leiden.

Main sponsor Zorg en Zekerheid extended their contract with 3 years in the 2014 offseason, and a new head coach was signed in Eddy Casteels. In the 2014–15 season, Leiden finished 2nd in the regular season, but once again was eliminated by Groningen in the Semi-finals.

In 2019, Leiden won the NBB Cup after defeating Landstede Zwolle 87–69 in the final.

On 17 May 2020, Leiden signed Geert Hammink as its new head coach for the 2020–21 season. Leiden went on to capture its fourth DBL championship. Star players of the team were league MVP Emmanuel Nzekwesi and Playoffs MVP Worthy de Jong.

Since the 2021–22 season, Leiden plays in the BNXT League, in which the national leagues of Belgium and the Netherlands have been merged. On 11 June 2022, Leiden won the inaugural BNXT championship. De Jong was named the league's Finals MVP and retired from professional basketball after. Leiden also had its best performance in Europe ever, reaching the semifinals of the 2021–22 FIBA Europe Cup.

After the successful season, coach Hammink signed with Skyliners Frankfurt; star player Worthy de Jong retired from professional basketball. In July 2022, Roberts Štelmahers was acquired as the club's new head coach. However, Stelmahers later signed another contract with Nymburk in the Czech Republic, causing Leiden to seek a replacement. On August 15, Leiden signed Doug Spradley as new head coach to a one-year contract.

On 12 March 2023, ZZ Leiden won their fourth-ever Cup title after beating Landstede Hammers 72–70 in the Landstede Sportcentrum.

Arenas

Since its re-inception in 2006, Leiden has used the Vijf Meihal as its home arena. The arena, which is also used for gymnastics of high school students, is nicknamed De Schuur (The Barn) by ZZ Leiden fans.

The municipality of Leiden will replace the Vijf Meihal with the newly built Indoor Sportcentrum, which will have a capacity of 2,435 people. Building has started in 2021 and is expected to be finished in 2023.

Vijf Meihal (2006–present)
Indoor Sportcentrum (from 2023)

Logos and names

Club records
The list only includes records since ZZ Leiden was established in 2006. Bold denotes still active with team. As of the end of the 2019–20 season:

Players

Current roster

Depth chart

Retired numbers

Notable players

Individual awards

BNXT League Dream Team
Asbjørn Midtgaard – 2022
BNXT League Finals MVP
Worthy de Jong – 2022
BNXT League Player of the Year
Worthy de Jong – 2022
BNXT League Sixth Man of the Year
Worthy de Jong – 2022
DBL Most Valuable Player
Art Collins – 1978
Jerry Beck – 1984
Toon van Helfteren – 1986
Danny Gibson – 2010
Worthy de Jong – 2016
Darius Thompson – 2019
Emmanuel Nzekwesi – 2021

DBL All-Star Team
David Chiotti – 2009
Danny Gibson – 2010
Ronny LeMelle – 2010
Seamus Boxley – 2011, 2012
Thomas Jackson – 2012
Worthy de Jong – 2013, 2015, 2016, 2021
Ross Bekkering – 2013
Joshua Duinker – 2014
Carrington Love – 2018
Maurice Watson, Jr. – 2019
Darius Thompson – 2019
Emmanuel Nzekwesi – 2021

DBL Defensive Player of the Year
Mohamed Kherrazi – 2015, 2016, 2019
Worthy de Jong – 2021
DBL Sixth Man of the Year
Dylon Cormier – 2016
Rogier Jansen – 2017
Sergio De Randamie – 2019
Riley LaChance – 2021

DBL Most Improved Player
Worthy de Jong – 2011
DBL Rookie of the Year
Joey Schelvis – 2009
Joshua Duinker – 2014
Emmanuel Nzekwesi – 2021
DBL Coach of the Year
Ruud Harrewijn – 1985
Toon van Helfteren – 2010, 2011, 2012
Geert Hammink – 2021

Trophies

National competitions
Dutch Basketball League
Winners (4): 1977–78, 2010–11, 2012–13, 2020–21
Runners-up (7): 1978–79, 1979–80, 1980–81, 1983–84, 1984–85, 2011–12, 2017–18, 2021–22
Dutch Cup
Winners (3): 2009–10, 2011–12, 2018–19, 2022–23
Runners-up (3): 2013–14, 2015–16, 2017–18
Dutch Supercup
Winners (3): 2011, 2012, 2021
Runners-up (4): 2013, 2014, 2018, 2019

Regional competitions
BNXT League
Winners (1): 2021–22
BNXT Supercup
Runners-up (1): 2021

Season by season

International record
ZZ Leiden made its debut in the European stage in 1978 when it entered the European Champions Cup. In 1982, Leiden played in the FIBA Intercontinental Cup, qualifying as hosts of the competition.
{| class="wikitable" style="font-size:95%; text-align:left;"
|+ Record
! Competition
! 
! 
! 
! 
! 
|-
|-
| 1 FIBA Champions Cup / EuroLeague || align="center"| || align="center"|5 || align="center"|– || align="center"|1 || align="center"|
|-
| 2 FIBA Saporta Cup / ULEB Cup / Eurocup || align="center"| || align="center"|16 || align="center"|– || align="center"|12 || align="center"|
|-
| 3  Basketball Champions League / Korac Cup / EuroChallenge || align="center"| || align="center"|10 || align="center"|– || align="center"|22 || align="center"|
|-
| 4 FIBA Europe Cup (since 2016/2017) || align="center"| || align="center"|23 || align="center"|– || align="center"|23 || align="center"|
|-
|-class="sortbottom"
! scope="col" align="center"| Total ||  || 54 || – ||58 ||
Key

 (N) = Neutral venue

List of head coaches

References

External links
Official website  
Eurobasket.com B.S Leiden Page

 
Basketball teams established in 1958
Basketball teams in the Netherlands
Dutch Basketball League teams
Sports clubs in Leiden